The 20th century in the United States refers to the period in the United States from 1901 through 2000 in the Gregorian calendar.  For information on this period, see:

 History of the United States series:
 History of the United States (1865–1918)
 History of the United States (1918–1945)
 History of the United States (1945–1964)
 History of the United States (1964–1980)
 History of the United States (1980–1991)
 History of the United States (1991–2008)
 Historical eras:
 Progressive Era
 United States in World War I
 Roaring Twenties
 Great Depression in the United States
 United States in World War II
 Cold War
 Civil rights era
 Reagan era